Julie Su (born 1969) is an American attorney.

Julie Su may also refer to:
 Julie-Su, a Sonic the Hedgehog character
 Su Rui (born 1952), also known as Julie Su, Taiwanese singer